William J. Rennie (September 12, 1891 – December 10, 1964) was an American football and basketball coach.  Rennie served as the head football coach at Hillsdale College in Hillsdale, Michigan from 1920 and 1921, compiling a record of 11–4–1.  Ost was also the head basketball coach at Hillsdale from 1920 to 1922, tallying a mark of 12–16.

On August 12, 1920, Rennie married Elizabeth Adelaide Goodrich in Hillsdale. Later regarded as an expert in fly fishing, he died in 1964 and was buried in Hillsdale.

Head coaching record

Football

References

External links
 

1891 births
1964 deaths
Basketball coaches from Michigan
Hillsdale Chargers football coaches
Hillsdale Chargers men's basketball coaches
People from Holly, Michigan